Arab Abdi (also Romanized as ‘Arab ‘Ābdī) is a village in Qaryah ol Kheyr Rural District, in the Central District of Darab County, Fars Province, Iran. At the 2006 census, its population was 553, in 119 families.

References 

Populated places in Darab County